The 2019–20 South of Scotland Football League was the 74th season of the South of Scotland Football League, and the sixth season as the sixth tier of the Scottish football pyramid system. Stranraer reserves were the reigning champions.

The league remained at 16 teams despite the withdrawal of Annan Athletic reserves, as Caledonian Braves reserves (formerly Edusport Academy) joined the league. However, 12 matches into the season Dumfries YMCA withdrew.

The season began on 27 July 2019 and was scheduled to end on 25 April 2020, but on 13 March the league was indefinitely suspended due to the COVID-19 pandemic. On 4 May, the league voted to declare the season null and void.

Teams

The following teams changed division after the 2018–19 season.

To South of Scotland League
 Caledonian Braves reserves

From South of Scotland League
 Annan Athletic reserves

 Club has an SFA Licence (as of July 2019) and would have been eligible to participate in the Lowland League promotion play-off should they win the league. However, this was cancelled following the Lowland League's curtailment in April 2020.

League table at time of abandonment

Notes

References

External links

6
Sco
South of Scotland Football League